Tiger Shark is the name of three DC Comics characters.

Fictional character biographies

Tiger Shark I
The first Tiger Shark appeared in Military Comics #9 (May 1942), a Quality Comics publication (years before that company was purchased by DC Comics) in a Blackhawk story set in World War II. The character was more specifically called Lt. Tiger Shark, who is the skipper of the US vessel called the Phantom Clipper.

Tiger Shark II

The second Tiger Shark is Dr. Gaige, who first appeared in Detective Comics #147 (May 1949). He was a famed oceanographer known for many discoveries in his field. It was his boredom and greed that led him to a life of crime. Donning a striped orange diving costume complete with a helmet and tiger stripes, Gaige adopted a secret identity as the Tiger Shark. Recruiting a dockside gang of criminals to do his bidding, Tiger Shark led his gang of thugs to an undersea headquarters in a sunken ship 200 miles from shore. Tiger Shark became a brilliant criminal mastermind plotting a series of spectacular crime sprees at sea and Gotham City's waterfront. In May 1949, Batman and Robin took an interest in Tiger Shark's crime spree and used the "sub-batmarine" to help them apprehend Tiger Shark. The devices on the sub-batmarine were successful at apprehending Tiger Shark. Ironically, the "sub-batmarine" that Batman and Robin used to captured Tiger Shark had been designed especially for their use by Dr. Gaige himself, much to the surprise of both parties after Tiger Shark was unmasked by Batman and his true identity exposed.

Tiger Shark III
A new Tiger Shark appears in the "Hungry City" story in Detective Comics #878 (August 2011). This version, created for DC Comics by writer Scott Snyder and artist Jock, is a murderous pirate who tried to invest "dirty money" in the GGM Bank (which was owned by Tony Zucco's daughter Sonia Zucco). One day, the corpse of a killer whale was found in the lobby of the GGM Bank. When Batman meets up with Commissioner Gordon to talk with Sonia Zucco, she says that one of her tellers was found dead in the killer whale. Commissioner Gordon suspects that someone is intimidating Sonia Zucco into opening her bank to a criminal element. When Batman takes down the gun-running criminal Roadrunner and wanted to know who tipped him off, he learns from Roadrunner that the person who tipped him off was a woman who worked for Tiger Shark. When Roadrunner is brought to Gotham City Police Department, he makes a deal for a reduced sentence to District Attorney Spencer that Tiger Shark is planning to leave town with several rare animals to sell over the black market. Batman and Robin stake out and find Tiger Shark's yacht where Commissioner Gordon tells him that Roadrunner was right about Tiger Shark smuggling rare animals where it turns out that Tiger Shark had stolen some exotic birds from the Gotham City Aviary. Batman and Robin board Tiger Shark's yacht where they ended up fighting Tiger Shark's men. Tiger Shark knocks Batman into the yacht's pool which contained a crazed killer whale. Robin defeats Tiger Shark's men and makes his way to the pool where he uses Killer Whale Repellent on Batman to keep the killer whale away, but Tiger Shark had already gotten away in his submarine and had activated a bomb to detonate the yacht. The Dynamic Duo rescued the animals and released the killer whale into the ocean before the yacht exploded.

In The New 52 (a reboot of DC's continuity), the third version of Tiger Shark is reintroduced in Batman (vol. 2) #12 (October 2012), where he fights with Batman aboard his yacht. Batman defeats Tiger Shark and demands to know how Talon got into Wayne Towers on the east side (which was Tiger Shark's domain). Tiger Shark declines answering and unleashes a tiger on him. The battle is interrupted by Harper Row who runs Tiger Shark's yacht into the shore. Batman then defeats Tiger Shark.

Powers and abilities
The second Tiger Shark was a brilliant criminal mastermind able to plan spectacular crimes at sea and on Gotham's coast. He possessed an array of underwater-use weapons. Tiger Shark also almost always carried a handgun. Also, Tiger Shark and his henchmen used special jet water skis that enable them to maneuver on and under water.

In other media
The second incarnation of Tiger Shark makes non-speaking appearances in Batman: The Brave and the Bold.

See also
 List of Batman family enemies

References

External links
 Tiger Shark I's bio
 Tiger Shark II's bio
 Tiger Shark at Comic Vine

DC Comics superheroes
DC Comics supervillains
Comics characters introduced in 1949
Characters created by Dick Sprang
Characters created by Bill Finger